Filipino boy band BGYO debuted on the music scene in January of 2021. They have since released or featured 16 high quality music videos notable for synchronized dance moves and undeniable aesthetics. The group have appeared also in several commercials or advertisements for brands such as H&M, Sprite, Mentos and Chowking, among others.

BGYO promoted their debut single "The Light" (2021) with a music video which garnered more than a million YouTube views, 6 days after its release, and its the fastest debut music video by a P-pop group to reach 1 Million views in YouTube. It also broke the record for being the "Most Liked Music Video in a Debut Song" by a P-pop group of all time.

Music videos

2020s

Digital videos

Filmography

Film

Series

Television

Online shows

References

External links 
 

BGYO
Videographies of Filipino artists